The Swedish Ice Hockey Association in Swedish, is an association of Swedish ice hockey clubs. It was established in Stockholm on 17 November 1922 by representatives from seven clubs. Before then, organized ice hockey in Sweden had been administered by the Swedish Football Association. In 1920, Sweden became a member of the International Ice Hockey Federation (IIHF). In addition to ice hockey, SIF is also responsible for inline hockey.

The association's general secretary is Tommy Boustedt.

Leagues and levels 
The Swedish Ice Hockey Association is involved in all levels of ice hockey in Sweden. It organizes the two Swedish Championship leagues, the men's Swedish Hockey League (SHL) and Swedish Women's Hockey League (SDHL), in addition to other national, regional, and district leagues and tournaments.
 
Men's National
 Swedish Hockey League (SHL)
 HockeyAllsvenskan
 Hockeyettan (previously called Division 1)
 J20 SuperElit (also called J20 Nationell)
 J18 Allsvenskan ('Under-18 All-Swede')
 U16 SM-slutspel (Under-16 Swedish Championship Playoff')

Women's National
 Swedish Women's Hockey League (SDHL)

 
Men's Regional
 HockeyTvåan
 HockeyTrean
 J18 Elit
 J16 Elit
 
Women's Regional
 DamEttan
 DamTvåan

Regional Districts

National teams 

Sweden has eight national hockey teams:
 Men's National Team  - Tre Kronor
 Women's National Team - Damkronorna
 Men's National U20 - Juniorkronorna (also called Team 20)
 Men's National U19 – Team 19
 Men's National U18 - Småkronorna (also called Team 18)
 Women's National Under-18 Team – Damlandslaget U18
 Men's National U17 – Team 17
 Women National U16 – Damlandslaget U16
 Men's National U16 – Team 16
 Men's National Inline Team

Chairmen
The following have served as chairman.

1922–1924: Isaac Westergren
1924–1948: Anton Johanson
1948–1973: Helge Berglund
1973–1978: Ove Rainer
1978–1983: Arne Grunander
1983–2002: Rickard Fagerlund
2002–2004: Kjell Nilsson
2004–2017: Christer Englund
2017–: Anders Larsson

References

External links 
 Svenska Ishockeyförbundet (Official site both in Swedish only)

Ice hockey in Sweden
Ice Hockey
International Ice Hockey Federation members
Ice hockey governing bodies in Europe
Sports organizations established in 1922
1922 establishments in Sweden